Protein methyltransferase II may refer to:

 Histone methyltransferase
 Protein-glutamate O-methyltransferase